The Man Machine Poem Tour was a concert tour by The Tragically Hip in support of their thirteenth full-length studio album Man Machine Poem. The tour consisted of 15 shows, the first held on July 22, 2016, in Victoria, British Columbia, and the last held on August 20, 2016, at the Rogers K-Rock Centre in Kingston, Ontario.

The tour was announced on May 25, 2016, following an announcement the previous day regarding singer Gord Downie's brain cancer diagnosis. A portion of the proceeds of the tour were donated to the Sunnybrook Foundation, the independent fundraising arm of the Sunnybrook Health Sciences Centre; in addition to the ticket sale proceeds themselves, both Sunnybrook and the Canadian Cancer Society reported a significant increase in direct donations, totalling over one million dollars, from the public during the tour. CBC broadcast the tour's final concert in Kingston on its radio, television, and digital platforms, which was seen by 11.7 million viewers across all platforms, and a DVD and Blu-ray of the concert was released in December 2017.

Although generally reported by the media as such, at the time the band refrained from officially labeling the concerts as their farewell tour, and instead communicated the hope that Downie's health would remain stable enough for them to tour again in the future. However, Downie died of the illness on October 17, 2017. In July 2018, guitarist Rob Baker declared that the Tragically Hip were now inactive and the members had no plans to perform under the name again without Downie.

Cultural analysis
Throughout the summer, the nature of the tour resulted in a considerable volume of analysis of the band, the tour and its impact on Canadian culture appearing in the media. This included a number of international outlets which had never before devoted significant coverage to the band, including CNN, BBC News, The Guardian and The New Yorker.

Canadian media outlets which would ordinarily only publish reviews of local concerts published an ongoing series of reviews of every stop on the tour, including unusually thorough analysis of the setlists.

The newsmagazine Maclean's published interviews throughout the summer with other musicians and cultural figures who had been friends, fans, collaborators or tourmates of the band, including Jim Cuddy of Blue Rodeo, Geoffrey Kelly of Spirit of the West, John K. Samson of The Weakerthans, Dave Bidini of Rheostatics, Peter Garrett of Midnight Oil, novelist Joseph Boyden, singer-songwriters Joel Plaskett and Sarah Harmer, and record producer Steve Berlin.

Both Maclean's and the Toronto Star also sent journalists to the town of Bobcaygeon, Ontario to explore the impact of one of the Tragically Hip's most famous songs, "Bobcaygeon".

Ticket sales controversy
Due to the news of Downie's cancer diagnosis, demand for tickets was higher than for any of the band's concert tours since the 1990s. However, many fans ended up stymied by ticket scalpers; even in the advance presale to members of the band's fan club, all available tickets were sold out within minutes, and many tickets almost immediately began showing up on resale sites such as StubHub, at inflated prices of up to $5,000 for the Kingston show, and up to $1,300 for most other shows. The same occurred when general market tickets were released; in some cities, the general release tickets were entirely sold out less than one minute after going on sale. One scalper even set up a dedicated domain, thehiptickets.com.

The band described themselves as sad and concerned by the situation, but noted that ticket sales were largely out of their own control. They responded by adding further shows to the tour, and by redesigning the planned stage configuration in order to release additional seats. Ontario's provincial government announced plans to review its regulations around ticket sales, and two scalpers were arrested in Winnipeg. The public outcry led CBC Television to explore options for broadcast of the Kingston show, and also resulted in a record number of booking requests for the Practically Hip, a long-running Tragically Hip tribute band, to play private Tragically Hip tribute parties across Canada.

Jesse Modz, a DJ for CHTZ-FM in St. Catharines, Ontario, aired a segment on his radio show in which he fooled a scalper in Mississauga into driving to St. Catharines by offering a $300 premium on top of the asking price; when the scalper arrived, Modz did not purchase the tickets, but rather confronted him about the ethics of scalping.

Canadian music journalist Alan Cross called the situation "the most cold-blooded, market-driven display of capitalism that we've ever seen involving Canadian concerts."

In October 2016, Live Nation Entertainment formally admitted for the first time that at least two-thirds of all tickets for the tour were snapped up by ticket brokers, leaving less than one-third of the tickets available to be purchased at face value by fans.

In February 2017, the government of Ontario formally announced that it would introduce legislation to ban "scalper bots".

Final concert
The final show on the tour was held on August 20, 2016 at the Rogers K-Rock Centre in the band's hometown of Kingston. The concert was simulcast in a special, The Tragically Hip: A National Celebration, airing commercial-free across the CBC's television and radio outlets, including CBC Television, CBC Radio One and CBC Radio 2, as well as on Sirius XM satellite radio, and online via CBC Music and YouTube. CBC broke away from its second-last night of primetime coverage of the 2016 Summer Olympics to air the concert; Ron Maclean hosted a short introduction from Rio de Janeiro,  where the Canadian Olympic athletes were themselves gathered for a viewing party at Canada House. At the end of the introduction, Maclean said: "We now go to this late breaking story on the CBC" referencing not only the concert itself but a lyric from the Tragically Hip song "Wheat Kings". The concert was attended by Canadian Prime Minister Justin Trudeau upon request by the band.

At least 11.7 million watched part of the concert across these platforms; 4.3 million were watching the television broadcast, while precise breakdowns of radio listeners, online streaming viewers or attendees at public screening parties have not been released. Public viewing was also set up in Kingston at the Springer Market Square and attended by approximately 22,000 people. Many other towns and cities across Canada also hosted public broadcasts of the concert. One particularly noted example was in Bobcaygeon, which held a public viewing on its main street; in addition to local residents, the event was also attended by a significant number of people who had made a "pilgrimage" to view the concert there because of the song.

On the same night as the Kingston concert, American rock band Pearl Jam were performing in Chicago; lead singer Eddie Vedder paid tribute to Downie and dedicated a performance of "Light Years" to Downie and the Tragically Hip. Canadian band Blue Rodeo were also performing a previously scheduled concert in Toronto on the same night; during that show, they performed a rendition of "Bobcaygeon" as video screens around the venue displayed scenes from the concurrent Hip concert in Kingston. Longtime Blue Rodeo guitarist and mandolinist Bob Egan, who was retiring from music and performing his final show with the band that evening, had been a guest musician on the original Tragically Hip recording of the song.

The CBC aired an encore of the concert on June 24, 2017.

The Kingston concert was released on DVD in December 2017, under the title A National Celebration. The DVD was released both on its own and as a box set with the documentary film Long Time Running.

In 2020, Cineplex Entertainment announced that select Canadian theatres would run a double bill of A National Celebration and Long Time Running in the week of September 18 as a special event.

Honours

The tour resulted in Downie being selected by the Canadian Press as its Canadian Newsmaker of the Year for 2016. This marked the first time in the award's history that a musician was chosen. Downie's death resulted in his being selected as Newsmaker of the Year again in 2017.

At the 5th Canadian Screen Awards, the CBC's broadcast of the final concert was nominated for and won six awards, including Best Live Entertainment Special, Best Direction in a Variety or Sketch Comedy Program or Series (David Russell), Best Production Design or Art Direction in a Non-Fiction Program or Series (Brent Clark), Best Photography in a Variety Program or Series (Alex Nadon and Tyler Pigeon), Best Sound in a Variety or Animated Program or Series (Jay Vicari, Peter Gary, Jon Erickson, Lee Moro and Mark Vreeken), and Best Performance in a Variety or Sketch Comedy Program or Series (The Tragically Hip).

The band and the tour are the subjects of Jennifer Baichwal and Nicholas de Pencier's documentary film Long Time Running, which premiered at the 2017 Toronto International Film Festival.

Tour dates

Setlists

The setlist for each show was different.  Typically the band played 20 or 21 songs followed by a three-song encore and then an additional two-song encore. For the final show, the band played 21 songs and then returned to play three encores of three songs each.

At virtually all shows, all songs from the same album were performed consecutively in sets of two, three or four, with that album not subsequently returned to for the rest of the show. Only a few times over the course of the tour was this pattern deviated from at all, normally for just one song.

The only unplayed album on the tour was their debut EP The Tragically Hip. No song in the band's catalogue was performed at all 15 shows; the band's 1990s signature songs "Ahead by a Century", "Bobcaygeon" and "Poets", and their more recent single "What Blue", were the most-played songs overall, having been performed at all but one or two of the shows.

References

2016 concert tours
2016 in Canadian music
Farewell concert tours
The Tragically Hip concert tours
2016 controversies
Concert tours of Canada